The discography of American electropop band Blood on the Dance Floor consists of eleven studio albums, three compilation albums, eight extended plays, and forty-two singles.

Albums

Studio albums

Compilation albums

Extended plays

Singles

Promotional singles

Music videos

References

Discographies of American artists